Oreta pingorum is a moth in the family Drepanidae. It was described by Jeremy Daniel Holloway in 1998. It is found on Borneo, Sulawesi, Buru and on New Guinea.

References

Moths described in 1998
Drepaninae
Moths of Indonesia
Moths of New Guinea